{{Infobox racing car
| Car_name = Fondmetal GR01
| Image = 
| Category = Formula OneInterserie
| Constructor = Fondmetal
| Designer = Robin Herd (Technical Director) Tim Holloway (Chief Designer) Tino Belli (Head of Aerodynamics)
| Predecessor = Fondmetal F1
| Successor = Fondmetal GR02
| Team = Fondmetal F1 SpA
| Drivers = 14.  Andrea Chiesa15.  Gabriele Tarquini
| Technical ref =
| Chassis = carbon fibre monocoque
| Front suspension = double wishbones, pushrods
| Rear suspension = as front
| Length =
| Width =
| Height =
| Wheelbase =
| Track =
| Engine name = HBA5| Capacity = 
| Configuration = V8
| Turbo/NA = naturally-aspirated
| Engine position = mid-engined
| Power = 660 hp @ 12,000 rpm
| Gearbox name = 
| Gears = 
| Type = 
| Differential = 
| Weight =
| Fuel = Agip
| Lubricants =
| Tyres = Goodyear
| Debut = 1992 South African Grand Prix
| Races = 8
| Wins = 0
| Cons_champ = 
| Drivers_champ = 
| Teams_champ = 
| Poles = 0
| Fastest_laps = 0
}}
The Fondmetal GR01 was a Formula One car designed by Robin Herd, Tim Holloway and Tino Belli for the Fondmetal F1 SpA team. It was used in the first part of 1992 season.

The car was based on the Fomet F1 and was also equipped with a Ford engine, not the DFR fitted to the Fomet F1, but the HB, which had 100hp more power than the DFR. Fondmetal fielded two cars, for Andrea Chiesa and Gabriele Tarquini.

The GR01 recorded poor results; the model never saw the finish line.

One of GR01s was bought by Ranieri Randaccio, who redesigned the car, by enlarging the airbox and adding wheel covers over the wheels, for use in the Interserie. He raced this car from 1994 to 1997 and took second places at Most (1994, 1997) and Brands Hatch (1996).

Complete Formula One results
(key) (results in bold indicate pole position, results in italics'' indicate fastest lap)

References 

 
 

Fondmetal Formula One cars